The 2021–22 season was Burnley's sixth consecutive season in the Premier League and the 140th year in their history. This season, the club participated in the Premier League, FA Cup and EFL Cup. The season covered the period from 1 July 2021 to 30 June 2022.

Burnley suffered poor form throughout their season and in mid-April, with the club in the relegation zone, manager Sean Dyche was sacked after nearly 10 years in charge. Under-23 manager Mike Jackson was appointed as caretaker, and results did initially pick up - however, a run of one point from the team's last four games, including a last-day 2–1 home defeat to Newcastle United, saw Burnley end the season in 18th position and condemn them to relegation to the EFL Championship for the 2022–23 season.

After the match against Liverpool on 21 August 2021 (2–0 loss), Burnley broke the Premier League record for the most consecutive games without a red card, after having no player sent off in 95 matches. This run ended at 119 games when Nathan Collins received a red card during a match against Brentford on 12 March 2022.

Transfers

Transfers in

Transfers out

Loans out

Pre-season friendlies

Competitions

Premier League

League table

Results summary

Results by matchday

Matches

FA Cup

EFL Cup

Appearances and goals
Source:
Numbers in parentheses denote appearances as substitute.
Players with names struck through and marked  left the club during the playing season.
Players with names in italics and marked * were on loan from another club for the whole of their season with Burnley.
Players listed with no appearances have been in the matchday squad but only as unused substitutes.
Key to positions: GK – Goalkeeper; DF – Defender; MF – Midfielder; FW – Forward

See also
 2021–22 in English football
 List of Burnley F.C. seasons

References

Burnley F.C. seasons
Burnley